This is a list of Super featherweight boxing champions, as recognized by boxing organizations:

 The World Boxing Association (WBA), established in 1921 as the National Boxing Association (NBA).
 The World Boxing Council (WBC), established in 1963.
 The International Boxing Federation (IBF), established in 1983.
 The World Boxing Organization (WBO), established in 1988.

See also
 List of British world boxing champions

References

External links

Super Featherweight Champions

World boxing champions by weight class